The Ceremonial Guard Battalion, also known as the Honour Battalion is a military unit of the Macedonian Military. The mission of the Ceremonial Guard Battalion is to perform military honors for all events regulated by the rules of engagement in ARNM, as well as maintaining the combat readiness of the Ceremonial Guard Battalion units at the highest level.

History
After the departure of Yugoslav People Army's from Macedonia, the Ceremonial Guard Battalion became an official regiment on March 26, 1992 as part of the First Guard Brigade. On July 22, 2002 the Honour and Serving Guards Battalion was designated as the main guard of honour for Macedonia. On March 1, 2006 it was renamed as the Honour and Serving Battalion. It has officially been entitled the Ceremonial Guard Battalion since April 1, 2012.

The battalion provided honours for the state funerals of President Boris Trajkovski and songwriter Toše Proeski.

Structure

 Battalion Command
 Battalion Commander
 Battalion Headquarters
 Administration Company
 Guard Company
 Guard Platoon
 Guard Platoon
 Guard Platoon
 Guard Platoon
 Guard Company
 Guard Platoon
 Guard Platoon
 Guard Platoon
 Guard Platoon
 Military Band

Military Band
The Military Band (Macedonian: Воениот оркестар) is a professional and unique unit inside the battalion, engaging in its duties by performing at significant protocol events organized by the army and the federal government. It was founded in 1944 in the city of Bitola, as part of the 7th Macedonian Drill Brigade. After the creation of the Socialist Federal Republic of Yugoslavia (SFRY), the band worked in the ranks of the Third Army Area of the Yugoslav People's Army, based in Skopje. After independence, the band was reformed to represent the ARM in its entirety, acting as a musical ambassador. It has performed in Bosnia and Herzegovina, Serbia and Bulgaria, and used foreign compositions made by famous composers such as Pyotr Ilyich Tchaikovsky, John Philip Sousa, Johann Strauss and John Williams.

Traditions
The members of the honour guard battalion performs the well-known drills such as their trademark "Egzircir" routine.

Unit Day
11 November, is known as the Day of the Unit. It was chosen in honour of the traditions of the First Macedonian Kosovo Shock Brigade of the National Liberation Army and Partisan Detachments of Macedonia, which was established on this date in 1943 in the village of Slivovo.

Activities
A contingent from one of the companies took part in the Great Union Day military parade in Romania in 2019. Within the visit, members of the Honor Guard Battalion met with the Ambassador of North Macedonia to Romania, Gabriel Atanasov.

Uniform
The Macedonian Ministry of Defence designed new uniforms for the battalion in 2010. The new uniform is based on the uniform of the Internal Macedonian Revolutionary Organization (IMRO) and specifically the uniform of Bulgarian revolutionary Ilyo Voyvoda who served in the Bulgarian Legion in the mid-19th century.

See also
Special Forces Battalion
The Rangers Battalion
Macedonian Air Force
Army of the Republic of Macedonia
Military Reserve Force (Macedonia)
Military Service for Security and Intelligence
Macedonia

References

Military units and formations of North Macedonia
Military units and formations established in 2002
Guards of honour